The Women's 50m breaststroke event at the 2010 South American Games was held on March 26, with the heats at 10:06 and the Final at 18:02.

Medalists

Records

Results

Heats

Final

References
Heats
Final

Breaststroke 50m W